Dichin is a village in central northern Bulgaria, located about 25 kilometres north of the old university town of Veliko Tarnovo, just north of the Rositsa River, in the southern little hill part.

Geography 
It is located in Veliko Tarnovo Municipality.

History 
Near Dichin passed a water canal from the river Rositsa to the ancient Roman city Nicopolis ad Istrum. Cooperation "Saglasie" was established in 1925.

Culture 
Communication center "Zora 1873" founders of the culture center were Matey Preobrajenski, the teacher Vasil Nedelchev and priest pop Petar Draganov.

Religion 
The Orthodox Church "Sveta Paraskeva" (Saint Paraskeva) was built in 1843.

Economy 
From 1948 to 1991 in the village were existed Labour Cooperative farm "Parvi mai" (First May). From 1934 to 1987 in Dichin existed the ceramics factory "Nacho Ivanov".

Mill Brother Damyanovi (founded in 1905)

References 

Villages in Veliko Tarnovo Province